The Cooper Mansion is a property in Laramie, Wyoming, that is on the National Register of Historic Places. It was built in 1921, when Richard, Barbara, and John Cooper, who inherited from their father, Frank Cooper's, vast estate of mineral rights, which people had to be a resident of the United States to access. The house was designed by Wilbur Hitchcock. Barbara Cooper died in 1979, and the University of Wyoming bought it in 1980.  It currently houses the American Studies program at the university.

References

External links

University of Wyoming: About the Cooper House
University of Wyoming: About the Cooper House
Cooper Mansion at the Wyoming State Historic Preservation Office

Houses in Albany County, Wyoming
Buildings and structures in Laramie, Wyoming
Houses on the National Register of Historic Places in Wyoming
University of Wyoming
National Register of Historic Places in Albany County, Wyoming
1921 establishments in Wyoming
Houses completed in 1921